A crown is a unit of currency used in the Czech Republic, Iceland, Norway, Sweden and Denmark (including the Faroe Islands and Greenland).

Alternative names
"Crown", or its equivalent in other languages, is derived from the Latin word corona. The symbol for crown is usually "kr". Some countries use another symbol for it like Íkr, -, Kč.

The local name for "crown" depends on the official language of the country.

Current use 

Czech: koruna
Norwegian and Danish: krone
Icelandic and Faroese: króna
Swedish: krona
 Greenlandic: koruuni
Northern Sami: ruvdna

Historical use 
Estonian: kroon
German: Krone (capital letter k)
Hungarian: korona
Slovak: koruna

Current use of a currency called crown

Historical use of a currency called crown

See also

Crown (British coin)

References

Denominations (currency)
Economy of Europe